

R

References

Lists of words